"Little Angel" is the first single from the Finnish gothic metal band Charon, from their album Downhearted. The single rose to number 5 on the Finnish singles chart.

Track listing 
 Little Angel
 Sister Misery

References 

2001 singles
Charon (band) songs
2001 songs